Leonard Keith Ward (17 February 1879 – 30 September 1964) was an Australian geologist and public servant.

Ward was born in Petersham, New South Wales and was educated at Sydney and Brisbane Grammar Schools then the University of Sydney (B.A., 1900; B.E., 1903) where he was taught by Edgeworth David.

Ward worked at  BHP then at the Western Australian School of Mines, Kalgoorlie, from 1903. He played one first-class cricket match for Tasmania in 1907–08. In 1919 he became secretary to the minister of mines.

Ward was awarded the Clarke Medal by the Royal Society of New South Wales in 1930 and the Verco Medal by the Royal Society of South Australia in 1955.

See also
 List of Tasmanian representative cricketers

References

External links
Bernard O'Neil, 'Ward, Leonard Keith (1879 - 1964)', Australian Dictionary of Biography, Volume 16, MUP, 2002, pp 489–490.
 

1879 births
1964 deaths
Australian geologists
Australian cricketers
People educated at Brisbane Grammar School
People educated at Sydney Grammar School
Tasmania cricketers
University of Sydney alumni